The George Cooper House is a historic residence located in Maquoketa, Iowa, United States.  This is one of several Victorian houses in town that are noteworthy for their quoined corners, a rare architectural feature in Iowa.  The two-story brick house features decorative gable ends, inset porches, bay window, and a gambrel dormer.  It was built in 1884, which were known as financial boom years for Maquoketa.  The house is located in a neighborhood with other late 19th and early 20th century houses.  It was listed on the National Register of Historic Places in 1991.

References

Houses completed in 1884
Victorian architecture in Iowa
Houses in Maquoketa, Iowa
National Register of Historic Places in Jackson County, Iowa
Houses on the National Register of Historic Places in Iowa